The Tacoma Times was a newspaper published in Tacoma, Washington from 1903 to 1949. It was founded by E. W. Scripps, with editorial personnel taken from the Seattle Star.

References

External links

 Incomplete archive of the Tacoma Times, at Chronicling America

Defunct newspapers published in Washington (state)
Publications established in 1903
Publications disestablished in 1949
Mass media in Tacoma, Washington
Former E. W. Scripps Company subsidiaries
1903 establishments in Washington (state)